Akron is an unincorporated community in Fairview Township, Cowley County, Kansas, United States.

History
The first post office at Akron (called Little Dutch until 1882) was opened in 1872, and remained in operation until it was discontinued in 1912.

Education
The community is served by Winfield USD 465 public school district.

References

Further reading

External links
 Cowley County maps: Current, Historic, KDOT

Unincorporated communities in Cowley County, Kansas
Unincorporated communities in Kansas